The Hamilton Steelhawks were a junior ice hockey team in the Ontario Hockey League from 1984 to 1988. The team was based in Hamilton, Ontario, and played at Copps Coliseum.

History
The Brantford Alexanders were relocated in 1984 becoming the Hamilton Steelhawks. The franchise which started in Hamilton in 1953, twice left Hamilton for lack of an adequate arena but returned for the opening of Copps Coliseum. However the team was not well-supported, and played for only four seasons in Hamilton before moving to Niagara Falls, Ontario to play as the Thunder.

The Steelhawks name was chosen to reflect the steel industry in Hamilton. The modernized name and logo was designed to catch on with a young fan base as well. The team enjoyed three successful playoff runs, although they never made a trip to the league finals.

Notable alumni are NHL stars Shayne Corson, Keith Primeau and NHL tough guy Bob Probert. Wayne Gretzky's younger brother Keith Gretzky also played for the Steelhawks, and was the co-winner 1986–87 William Hanley Trophy as the OHA's Most Sportsmanlike Player.

The team was owned by Jack Robillard, Bob Willson and Al Martin, who also owned the London Knights.

Coaches
1984–85 - Dave Draper, B. LaForge
1985–86 - Bill LaForge
1986–87 - Bill LaForge
1987–88 - Bill LaForge

NHL alumni

Yearly results

Regular season

Playoffs
1984–85 Defeated North Bay Centennials 9 points to 7 in first round. Defeated London Knights 6 points to 2 in quarter-finals. Lost to S.S. Marie Greyhounds 9 points to 1 in semi-finals.
1985–86 Out of playoffs.
1986–87 Defeated Guelph Platers 4 games to 1 in first round. Lost to Windsor Spitfires 4 games to 0 in quarter-finals.
1987–88 Defeated North Bay Centennials 4 games to 0 in first round. Defeated London Knights 4 games to 2 in quarter-finals. Lost to Windsor Spitfires 4 games to 0 in semi-finals.

Arena
The Hamilton Steelhawks played home games at Mountain Arena for 1984–85 and then moved to Copps Coliseum in December 1985 as the arena was not ready in time for the start of the season . The annual OHL / QMJHL All-Star game was played here in 1988. .

External links
Mountain Arena - The OHL Arena & Travel Guide
Copps Coliseum  - The OHL Arena & Travel Guide

1984 establishments in Ontario
1988 disestablishments in Ontario
Defunct Ontario Hockey League teams
Ice hockey clubs established in 1984
Ice hockey clubs disestablished in 1988
Ice hockey teams in Hamilton, Ontario